Ichthyophis orthoplicatus,  also known as the Pattipola caecilian or brown caecilian, is a species of caecilian endemic to Sri Lanka. It is found in a range of natural and man-made habitats including evergreen forests, rubber and tea plantations, paddy fields, rural gardens and farms, wetlands (boggy areas), and cattle pastureland.

References

orthoplicatus
Amphibians of Sri Lanka
Endemic fauna of Sri Lanka
Amphibians described in 1965
Taxa named by Edward Harrison Taylor